The 2002–03 Wisconsin Badgers women's ice hockey team was the Badgers' 3rd season. Head coach Mark Johnson was in his first season as Badgers head coach.

Exhibition games

Regular season

Schedule

Awards and honors
Mark Johnson, WCHA Coach of the Year
Sis Paulsen, All-WCHA second team
Kerry Weiland, All-WCHA second team

Team awards
Kendra Anthony, Offensive Player of the Year award
Sharon Cole, Rookie of the Year
Kathy Devereaux, UW Athletic Board scholars
Kathryn Greaves, W Club Community Service Award
Sis Paulsen and Katie Temple, Badger Award
Sis Paulsen, Jeff Sauer Award
Sis Paulsen, Defensive Player of the Year award

References

Wisconsin
Wisconsin Badgers women's ice hockey seasons
Wiscon
Wiscon